New Baltimore is an unincorporated community and census-designated place (CDP) in eastern Fauquier County, Virginia, United States. The population as of the 2010 census was 8,119. The community has existed since the early 19th century, but it has had its most significant growth since the 1980s. It is the portion of Fauquier County with the easiest access to Washington, D.C., and as a result, many people who live in New Baltimore commute into DC. Other major communities close to New Baltimore are Warrenton, Gainesville/Haymarket area, and Manassas. The area officially considered to be New Baltimore expanded significantly in 2006 with Fauquier County's designation of service districts, of which New Baltimore is one. The service district designation provides added access to utilities such as water and sewer, and targets the area for growth.

History 
Given that it sat aside the turnpike connecting Warrenton and Alexandria, the town was frequently visited by Union troops during the Civil War. It was in the vicinity of several major battles, including the Battle of Brandy Station, First and Second Battles of Bull Run, and Battle of Cedar Mountain.  In the winter of 1862-1863, General William B. Franklin commanded 40,000 troops who camped there until they got their supplies from Gainesville depot.  It was sometimes in the control of the Union during the war. Later in the war the second brigade of the 27th New York Volunteer Infantry commanded by General Joseph Jackson Bartlett was encamped in New Baltimore from July 31, 1863 through September 15, 1863.

The original New Baltimore is northwest of and slightly off the highway from what is now part of the New Baltimore CDP. The early 19th century community of New Baltimore was an incorporated town dependent on what was then known as Alexandria Turnpike, now known as Lee Highway, which went through the village. This community had an Episcopal church, as well as a Baptist church founded in 1762. In the 1850s New Baltimore was a post village with a church and a school. Its postmaster's salary was $19 in 1870.

The U.S. Post Office listed it in 1897, but not in 1908. Between those dates, Lee Highway was routed to the south of New Baltimore, so the town became just an enclave of houses from varying periods. The original central point of the town, James Hampton's Tavern (built 1823), still stands at the intersection of Old Alexandria Turnpike and Georgetown Road, and is currently a private residence. The New Baltimore Historic District was listed on the National Register of Historic Places in 2004.

Geography

The major road in the community remains Lee Highway, U.S. Route 15/29. Another important road is Beverley's Mill Road / Broad Run Church Road (County Route 600), which is technically a secondary road, now a well-traveled commuter road.

The New Baltimore CDP now extends well south and east of the original settlement. The CDP border follows US 15/29 east to Riley Road, then south to Broad Run Church Road, then east to Vint Hill Road (Virginia State Route 215), then southeast to the Prince William County line. Following the county line southeast, the CDP border briefly turns south along an intermittent brook, then turns southwest on Rogues Road to Dumfries Road, turning northwest back to US 15 and 29 less than 1 mile northeast of the Warrenton town limits. The CDP limits turn northeast along US 15/29, then north on Mill Run to Rosedale Farm Road, then west on Old Bust Head Road, north along lot lines to Snow Mountain Road, east back to Old Bust Head Road, east further to Georgetown Road, then east and south along lot lines around the original New Baltimore back to US 15/29. The CDP limits include the former Vint Hill Farms Station military site.

The community is part of the Cedar Run and Broad Run watersheds, which join to form the Occoquan River, a tributary of the Potomac.

See also
Beverley Mill

References

Census-designated places in Fauquier County, Virginia
Census-designated places in Virginia